Teliamura is one of the 60 Legislative Assembly constituencies of Tripura state in India. It is in Khowai district and is reserved for candidates belonging to the Scheduled Tribes. It is also part of East Tripura Lok Sabha constituency.

Members of Legislative Assembly

 1967: P. K. Das, Indian National Congress
 1972: Anil Sarkar, Communist Party of India (Marxist)
 1977: Jitendra Sarkar, Communist Party of India (Marxist)
 1983: Gita Chowdhury, Indian National Congress
 1988: Jitendra Sarkar, Communist Party of India (Marxist)
 1993: Jitendra Sarkar, Communist Party of India (Marxist)
 1998: Jitendra Sarkar, Communist Party of India (Marxist)
 2003: Ashok Kumar Baidyar, Indian National Congress
 2008: Gouri Das, Communist Party of India (Marxist)
 2013: Gouri Das, Communist Party of India (Marxist)

Election results

2018 election

See also
List of constituencies of the Tripura Legislative Assembly
 Khowai district
 Teliamura
 Tripura East (Lok Sabha constituency)

References

Khowai district
Assembly constituencies of Tripura